San Miguel Chapultepec is a colonia or neighborhood in Delegación Miguel Hidalgo in Mexico City.

Its borders are:
 Avenida Constituyentes and Avenida Chapultepec on the west, bordering Chapultepec Park
 The Circuito Interior José Vasconcelos and Ave. Jalisco on the southeast, bordering the Condesa district (colonias Condesa and Hipódromo Condesa) and colonia Tacubaya
 Parque Lira on the southwest, bordering colonias Ampliación Daniel Garza, Observatorio and Tacubaya

The colonia's streets carry the names of generals and governors of Mexico. The buildings mostly consist of houses, whether still used as residences or  converted into offices. Being a central neighborhood where the Circuito Interior freeway, Ave. Constituyentes (a main through road to Santa Fe, Toluca and points west), and the Ejes viales 2 and 4 South, the area is saturated with traffic.

Demographics
INEGI reported 7 605 inhabitants in 2005.

Religious buildings
 Parroquía de San Miguel Arcángel
 Santuario Parroquial de Nuestra Señora del Carmen "La Sabatina".

Hospital
The Mocel hospital of the Grupo Ángeles group is located here.

Public transportation
Metro stations on the neighborhood's border are Chapultepec, Juanacatlán on Line 1; Constituyentes de la Line 7 y Tacubaya de la 1, 7 y 9.

Metrobús Line 2 serves Eje 4 Sur until Tacubaya with stops at De La Salle, Parque Lira, Tacubaya and Antonio Maceo (corner of Jalisco).

In the neighborhood there are EcoBici bikeshare bikes.

References

Miguel Hidalgo, Mexico City
Neighborhoods in Mexico City